Blup Blup Island is a small forested island off the northern coast of Papua New Guinea about 30 km offshore from Cape Girgir and is considered part of the Schouten Islands. It is located at latitude S 3°30'46" and longitude E 144°35'16". The island has a small population and is theoretically part of the Papuan province of East Sepik, although officially it is still a protectorate.

The island is volcanic (a stratovolcano) and a weak thermal area exists on the north west coast. The island is only 3.5 km wide with an irregular coastline and ancient lava flows. It is thought that Blup Blup last erupted in the Holocene. Fresh water is available on the island from wells. Other islands in the vicinity include Kadovar and Wei Island. There is a small islet about 200 m off the south-west shore of the island called Mut Mut, where there is a geodetic monitoring facility.

History
The first recorded sighting by Europeans of Kadovar Island was by the Spanish navigator Iñigo Órtiz de Retes on 21 July 1545, when on board of the carrack San Juan tried to return from Tidore to New Spain.

See also
List of volcanoes in Papua New Guinea

References

Mut Mut in Papua New Guinea Geodetic Monitoring Site

Islands of Papua New Guinea
Volcanoes of Papua New Guinea
Holocene stratovolcanoes
East Sepik Province